Non timor domini, non timor malus is the second studio album by the Italian Black ambient/Gothic rock band Militia Christi.

Track listing 

 Maledictum - 1.45
 Sescenti Sexaginta Sex - 5.03
 Secretum Magnum - 3.24
 Sanctus (Viae Perversae) - 4.41
 Cogitata Malum - 4:06
 Incarnationis Mysterium (Annus Dei) - 6.29
 Verax Vitis - 3.20
 Cor Maleficus - 5.31
 Sapientia - 3.23
 Pater Noster - 5.21
 Unlisted bonus track - 7.01

Line-up 

 Il Messia
 Il Predicatore
 La Santa Peccatrice
 S. Giuda L'Apostata

2004 albums